Mohammad Abdul-Samee' Mohammad Al-Dmeiri (born 30 August 1987) is a Jordanian footballer who plays as a left back for Al-Wehdat and the Jordan national football team.

International goals
Scores and results list Jordan's goal tally first.

International career statistics

Honours

Al-Wehdat
Jordan Premier League: 2006–07, 2007–08, 2008–09, 2010–11, 2010–11, 2013–14, 2015–16, 2017–18, 2020
Jordan FA Cup: 2008–09, 2009–10,  2010–11,2013–14, 
Jordan FA Shield: 2008, 2010, 2017, 2020
Jordan Super Cup: 2008, 2009, 2010, 2011, 2014, 2018, 2021

References

External links 
 
 
 Profile at the Jordan Football Association  
 goal.com

1987 births
Living people
Jordanian footballers
Jordan international footballers
Jordan youth international footballers
2011 AFC Asian Cup players
2015 AFC Asian Cup players
Association football defenders
Al-Wehdat SC players
Ittihad FC players
Al-Nojoom FC players
Al-Shamal SC players
Jordanian people of Palestinian descent
Sportspeople from Amman
Jordanian expatriate footballers
Jordanian expatriate sportspeople in Saudi Arabia
Jordanian expatriate sportspeople in Qatar
Expatriate footballers in Saudi Arabia
Expatriate footballers in Qatar
Saudi Professional League players
Saudi First Division League players
Qatar Stars League players
Jordanian Pro League players